Enterovibrio norvegicus is a bacterium species from the genus of Enterovibrio which has been isolated from the gut of the larvae of a flatfish (Scophthalmus maximus) in Norway.

References 

Vibrionales
Bacteria described in 2002